North Concord is an unincorporated village in the town of Concord, Essex County, Vermont, United States. North Concord has a post office with ZIP code 05858.

References

Unincorporated communities in Essex County, Vermont
Unincorporated communities in Vermont